Roger Agambire Agana , better known as Label, is a journalist from the Upper East Region of Ghana.

Life and career
Agana nurtured an interest in digital journalism and later co-founded Modernghana.com in 2005.

He took over the management of Spy Ghana in 2012 and later rebranded it as News Ghana. Today it is Ghana’s most popular online news portal.

Computer Background

Agana is a member of Penplusbytes (International Institute for ICT Journalism) Institute of Electrical and Electronics Engineers (IEEE), Association for Computing Machinery, IFEJ Ghana (Institute of Financial and Economic Journalists).

Economic contribution
He revealed his plans towards economic growth for Ghana with the rapper Asumadu]

Awards and nominations

References

External links
Official Website

Living people
1979 births
Ghanaian bloggers
Ghanaian internet celebrities
Gossip columnists
Ghanaian newspaper journalists
Ghanaian publishers (people)